The 1977 Düsseldorf International was a men's Grand Prix tennis circuit tournament held in Düsseldorf, West Germany and played on outdoor clay courts. It was the eighth edition of the tournament and was held from 16 May until 22 May 1977. First-seeded Wojciech Fibak won the singles title.

Finals

Singles
 Wojciech Fibak defeated  Ray Moore 6–1, 5–7, 6–2
 It was Fibak's 2nd singles title of the year and the 5th of his career.

Doubles
 Jürgen Fassbender /  Karl Meiler defeated  Paul Kronk /  Cliff Letcher 6–3, 6–3

References

Düsseldorf Grand Prix
1977 in West German sport